The premycotic phase is a phase of mycosis fungoides in which a patient has areas of red, scaly, itchy skin on areas of the body that are usually not exposed to sun. This is early-phase mycosis fungoides, but it is hard to diagnose the rash as mycosis fungoides during this phase. The premycotic phase may last from months to decades.

References

 Premycotic phase entry in the public domain NCI Dictionary of Cancer Terms

Lymphoid-related cutaneous conditions